K-244 is a  east–west state highway in the north-central portion of the U.S. state of Kansas. K-244's western terminus is at Milford Lake Road northwest of Junction City. Milford Lake Road travels south to K-18, then further south to I-70 and US-40 at exit 290. K-244's eastern terminus is at US-77 north of Junction City. The highway serves West Rolling Hills Park and Milford State Park, which are both adjacent to Milford Lake.

K-244 was approved to be constructed on June 12, 1964, by the Kansas State Highway Commission, now known as the Kansas Department of Transportation. The new K-244 was opened in 1967. In a resolution passed on May 10, 1967, it was approved to extend K-57 northward over the Milford Dam and back to US-77. At this time, K-244 Spur was approved to be built.

Route description

K-244's western terminus is at Milford Lake Road northwest of Junction City. West of Milford Lake Road, the highway continues as 3200 Avenue. Milford Lake Road travels south to K-18, then further south to I-70 and US-40 at exit 290. K-244 heads east to a junction with West Rolling Hill, which travels north to West Rolling Hills Park. The highway proceeds east, passing by one of the southern legs of Milford Lake, before reaching the southern terminus of K-244 Spur. The spur route allows access from eastbound K-244 to northbound K-57, and from southbound K-57 to westbound K-244, which can't be achieved at the western end of the K-57 and K-244 overlap. K-244 curves northeast then reaches an at-grade intersection with K-57. K-244 begins to overlap K-57 in a southeast direction as a divided four-lane highway. The highway proceeds a short distance then reaches its eastern terminus at US-77 north of Junction City. Past US-77 the highway continues as K-57 southbound.

The Kansas Department of Transportation (KDOT) tracks the traffic levels on its highways. On K-244 in 2020, they determined that on average the traffic varied from 525 vehicles per day near the western terminus to 615 vehicles per day slightly west of K-57. K-244 connects to the National Highway System at its eastern terminus with US-77.

History
K-244 was created by a resolution adopted by the State Highway Commission of Kansas, now known as KDOT, on June 12, 1964. It was created as the most direct route between the existing state highway system and Milford Lake. On January 20, 1966, the SHC opened bids for the construction of the new highway. On February 3, 1966, the SHC announced an approved bid of $1,959,798 (equivalent to $ in  dollars) for grading the new K-244 as well as the relocation of US-77 and K-82. Also, a bid of $19,984 (equivalent to $ in  dollars) was approved for a bridge on the new K-244. The new K-244 was opened in 1967.

In a resolution passed on May 10, 1967, it was approved to extend K-57 northward over the Milford Dam and back to US-77. At this time, K-244 Spur was approved to be built. In May 1968, work began to build the extension of K-57 over the dam. The project was completed by 1969. In July 1970, the SHC announced that flashing warning beacons will be added at the junction of K-57, K-244 and US-77. This was due to numerous accidents at the site including six being killed in one month. In addition to the flashing lights, the speed limit was lowered on K-57 and US-77 leading up to the intersection.

Major intersections

Spur route

The highway allows access from eastbound K-244 to northbound K-57, and from southbound K-57 to westbound K-244. K-244 Spur begins at K-244 and meanders in northeast direction to K-57. On K-244 Spur in 2020, KDOT determined that on average the traffic was 115 vehicles per day.

In a resolution passed on May 10, 1967, it was approved to extend K-57 northward over the Milford Dam and back to US-77. At this time, K-244 Spur was approved to be built. The project was completed by 1969. On July 21, 1993, floodwaters washed out a  section of K-244 Spur down to the bedrock. The highway was reopened in mid-October 1993.

Major intersections

Gallery

References

External links

KDOT State Map
Kansas Highways Routelog

244
Transportation in Geary County, Kansas